Hilary Mary Rose (born 9 July 1971 in Sale, Cheshire, England) is a female British field hockey goalkeeper.

Hockey career
Rose plays for Ipswich and England and has played for Great Britain and represented England from 1993 to 2002. She represented England and won a silver medal, at the 1998 Commonwealth Games in Kuala Lumpur. Four years later she won another silver medal at the 2002 Commonwealth Games.

Personal life
She is a qualified Diagnostic Radiographer having studied at Canterbury Christ Church University.

References

External links
 

1971 births
Living people
English female field hockey players
Female field hockey goalkeepers
Olympic field hockey players of Great Britain
British female field hockey players
Field hockey players at the 1996 Summer Olympics
Field hockey players at the 1998 Commonwealth Games
Field hockey players at the 2000 Summer Olympics
Commonwealth Games silver medallists for England
UMass Minutewomen field hockey coaches
UMass Minutewomen field hockey players
Commonwealth Games medallists in field hockey
Medallists at the 1998 Commonwealth Games